The Men's Scratch took place at 8 October 2010 at the Indira Gandhi Arena.

Results

External links
 Reports

Track cycling at the 2010 Commonwealth Games
Cycling at the Commonwealth Games – Men's scratch